The Jewish Telegraph is a British Jewish newspaper.  It was founded in December 1950 by Frank and Vivienne Harris, the parents of the current editor, Paul Harris.

Founding
Frank and Vivienne Harris founded the newspaper in their dining room in Salford in December 1950. Frank Harris was a London freelance journalist who, on his arrival in Manchester, noticed that its only Jewish newspaper was a freesheet.  He determined to establish a paid for Jewish weekly.

Expansion
Vivienne Harris oversaw the newspaper's expansion from 1950 to 2011. She established editions in Manchester, Leeds, Liverpool and Glasgow. In 1976, the Jewish Telegraph established a Leeds edition with its own editorial and advertising staff of nine, based in a local office. In 1981, the paper acquired the title of the monthly Liverpool Jewish Gazette, giving Merseyside its first Jewish weekly. The paper has its own editorial staff in Liverpool, based in offices at Harold House, the Liverpool Jewish Community Centre, which moved into the new King David Campus in September 2011. In June 1992, on the demise of the Glasgow Jewish Echo, the paper moved into Scotland within a week and began a weekly edition. A staff of four works from offices at the Glasgow Maccabi complex.  

The latest addition was a website in December 1999, which is entirely updated in the early hours of every Friday morning. The website remains in the same state in 2021 that it began with in 1999.

The paper is based in Park Hill, Bury Old Road in Prestwich.

References

External links
Official website

1950 establishments in the United Kingdom
Jewish newspapers published in the United Kingdom
Publications established in 1950
Weekly newspapers published in the United Kingdom